Edward Grady Partin Sr. (February 27, 1924 – March 11, 1990), was an American business agent for the Teamsters Union, and is best known for his 1964 testimony against Jimmy Hoffa, which helped Robert F. Kennedy convict Hoffa of jury tampering in 1964.

Teamster Union and mob activities 
Partin was the business manager of the five local IBT branches in Baton Rouge for 30 years. In 1961, he was charged by the union with embezzlement as union money was stolen from a safe. Two key witnesses in the grand jury died. He was indicted on June 27, 1962, for 26 counts of embezzlement and falsification and released on bail.

On August 14, 1962, Partin was sued for his role in a traffic accident injuring two passengers and killing a third. He was also indicted for first-degree manslaughter and leaving the scene of an accident. He also surrendered himself for aggravated kidnapping.

He was finally convicted of conspiracy to obstruct justice through witness tampering and perjury in March 1979. Partin pled no contest to numerous other corruption charges in the union, including embezzlement, and was released in 1986.

Testimony against Hoffa 
In 1963, Jimmy Hoffa, the president of the Teamsters, was arrested for attempted jury tampering in attempted bribery of a grand juror of a previous 1962 case involving payments from a trucking company. Partin testified that he was offered $20,000 to rig the jury in Hoffa's favor. The testimony was the primary evidence of the Justice Department that led to Hoffa being sentenced to eight years in prison. The entire case rested on his testimony and he was considered the lone witness.

Partin denied under oath that he was compensated by the Justice Department, but it was revealed that his ex-wife had her alimony payments given to her by the department. He originally denied that he would receive immunity or retroactive immunity for his testimony but it was later altered when he was under oath at a grand jury trial.

See also
J. Minos Simon, a Partin attorney

References

1924 births
1990 deaths
People from Woodville, Mississippi
Trade unionists from Louisiana
International Brotherhood of Teamsters people
Prisoners and detainees of the United States federal government
People associated with the assassination of John F. Kennedy
American extortionists
United States Marines
People from McComb, Mississippi
People from Baton Rouge, Louisiana
Military personnel from Mississippi
Deaths from diabetes
Louisiana Democrats